Ian Payne (born 16 December 1962) is a British broadcaster. He is currently a sports correspondent at ITV News and the host of a late-night current affairs phone-in show on LBC radio between 10pm and 1am.  He previously worked as a presenter for Radio 5 Live and Sky Sports.

Early life and education
Payne was born in Germany on 16 December 1962. His father, Peter Payne, is a consultant obstetrician and gynaecologist. He was educated at Radley College, Abingdon, an independent school, and then at Royal Holloway College and Lancashire Polytechnic. Before embarking on his broadcasting career, he worked as a teacher, a dustman and a hospital laundry assistant. While travelling through New Zealand, he was briefly employed by a farmer to bury goats.

Career

Early BBC career
Payne began his career in 1986 working as a trainee journalist on BBC Radio Lancashire, a position in which he won an award as Northwest Young Journalist of the Year. In 1988 he was promoted to a national role in the BBC Radio network's sport division, initially as a producer on Radio 2 and then in a variety of programmes including Radio 4's Today. His profile became even higher when he moved to BBC Radio 5 Live, where he presented coverage of major events such as the FA Cup Final and the finals of Rugby League and Rugby Union championships and fronted Sport on 5, the channel's flagship offering. In 2000 he became the presenter of 5 Live's weekday afternoon show. His work for the BBC won him two Sony Radio Awards.

Sky Sports
Payne joined Sky in 2003 initially presenting Monday Night Football.<ref>More about Ian Payne  LBC</ref> He was replaced by Jeff Stelling from the start of the 2005–06 season. He presented FA Cup coverage during 2005–06, and the League Cup from 2003 to 2006. Following Rob McCaffrey's departure from Sky, Payne hosted Gillette Soccer Special on Tuesdays and Wednesdays, before taking over as anchor of Goals on Sunday.

Return to BBC
Payne returned to Radio 5 Live in June 2010, again mainly presenting 5 Live Sport, as well as standing in on Up All Night, Tony Livesey's programme, and Weekend Breakfast.Weekend Breakfast Radio Times, 24 December 2011

In addition, Payne presented Scores, a Saturday sports programme on LBC, and also contributed to LBC's blog. Payne also presented the London and South East edition of the BBC Football League programme Late Kick Off in March 2011.

As a freelance, on 5 November 2010 Payne crossed National Union of Journalists picket lines to present a BBC Breakfast radio programme that was broadcast on 5 Live, Radio Ulster and Radio Scotland. He also crossed NUJ picket lines to present 5 Live Breakfast'' with Julia Bradbury on 15 July 2011.

ITV News
On 2 September 2013, Payne became the new ITV News Sports Correspondent, replacing BBC-bound Natalie Pirks.

Other TV work
In June 2012, Payne started presenting on Sports Tonight Live, a new sports television channel that broadcasts on Primetime Channel 498 on Sky. Payne continued to work for the station from the start of the 2012–13 football season, presenting every Tuesday and Wednesday night from 7-10pm alongside his regular guest, former Arsenal midfielder Perry Groves.

LBC
Payne presented Scores on Global Radio's LBC, a sports based talk show which aired from 3pm to 6:30pm on Saturday afternoons. In 2015, Payne's show was changed from being sports based to being a news phone-in discussion programme, with the new airtime of 3pm to 6pm on Saturdays.

In April 2018, Payne's show moved to the 'Early Breakfast' timeslot of 4am to 7am on Saturdays.

From 2018, Payne presents a Saturday & Sunday afternoon show 3-6pm, plus a cover presenter for Saturday Breakfast and other weekday shows across LBC network.

From 2020, Payne presents drive on LBC News between 4-7pm Monday - Wednesday, plus from September 2020 presents Saturday morning show 4-7am & Sunday afternoon show 4-7pm, plus cover presenter on LBC network.

In August 2022, Payne began a new Monday to Thursday late-night phone-in programme, between 10pm and 1am, replacing Tom Swarbrick who moved to the Drivetime programme.

Personal life
Payne is a fan of Leeds United, and an FA qualified referee. He resides in Brentford, West London.

References

External links
Ian Payne on LBC

1962 births
British sports broadcasters
ITN newsreaders and journalists
Living people
Sky Sports presenters and reporters
People educated at Radley College
LBC radio presenters